The Lenox School of Jazz was a summer programme of jazz education from 1957-1960, at the Music Barn in Lenox, Massachusetts.

Faculty included Dizzy Gillespie, Jimmy Giuffre, Percy Heath, Larry Ridley, Connie Kay, Jim Hall, Ralph Peña, Max Roach, Willis James.

Students included Ornette Coleman, Dizzy Sal, Jamey Aebersold, David Baker, Paul Bley, Attila Zoller, Lucille Butterman, Terry Hawkeye, Verne Elkins, Cevira Rose, Dale Hillary, and Esther Siegel.

Scholarships
A number of scholarships were available.

In 1959 the F. & M. Schaefer Brewing Company awarded the Shafer Scholarships to John Keyser, Paul Cohen, Steve Kuhn, Dave Mackay, Ian Underwood, Tony Greenwald and Herb Gardner. R.J. Schaefer III presented the scholarships.

Discography
 The Lenox Jazz School Concert - August 29, 1959 with Ornette Coleman, Don Cherry, Kenny Dorham, Jimmy Giuffre, Ian Underwood, Gunther Schuller, Gary McFarland, Attila Zoller, Steve Kuhn, Ran Blake, Larry Ridley (Fresh Sound)

Bibliography
 Jeremy Yudkin: The Lenox School of Jazz - A Vital Chapter in the History of American Music and Race Relations. .

Dizzy Gillespie with Al Fraser: “To Be or Not To Bop”- ‘School for Jazz.’ {ISBN 978-0-8166-6547-1}

References

External links
 Music Inn Archives
 Lenox History
 Lenox School of Music
 School of Jazz Photo Scrapbook
 New England Music education

Jazz music education